Soner Mezgitçi (born February 16, 1981) is a former Turkish volleyball player. He is 197 cm and plays as opposite hitter. He has been playing for Fenerbahçe Grundig and wears the number 9. He played over 100 times for the national team. He also played for Chenois from Switzerland and Calcit Kamnik from Slovenia.

He also played for Fenerbahçe in 2002-03 season. Netas, Arcelik, Besiktas, Ziraatbankasi.
He ended his career with Fenerbahçe in 2013.

Honours and awards
 2012-13 Turkish Men's Volleyball Super Cup  with Champion Fenerbahçe  
 2011-12 Turkish Men's Volleyball League Champion with Fenerbahçe
 2011-12 Turkish Men's Volleyball Cup Champion with Fenerbahçe
 2011-12 Turkish  Men's Volleyball Super Cup Champion with Fenerbahçe
 2010-11 Turkish Men's Volleyball League Champion with Fenerbahçe
 2005 Universiade Games Gold Medal Winner with National Team  
 2001-02 Turkish  Men's Volleyball League Champion with Arcelik 
 2001-02 Turkish Volleyball Cup Champion  with Arcelik 
 1999-2000 Turkish Men's Volleyball League Champion with Netas 
 1999-2000 Turkish Men's Volleyball Cup Champion  with Netas

External links 
 https://www.youtube.com/watch?v=1SU7yJlJvFY* 
 
 http://www.dailymotion.com/video/xmihhr_fbtv-
soner-mezgitci-roportaji-bolum-1_sport
 http://m.haberler.com/fenerbahce-grundig-erkek-voleybol-takimi-uc-3573617-haberi/
 http://www.voleybolextra.com/9962/soner-mezgitci-veda-etti/

References

1981 births
Living people
Volleyball players from Istanbul
Turkish men's volleyball players
Arçelik volleyballers
Fenerbahçe volleyballers
Beşiktaş volleyballers
Turkish expatriate sportspeople in Slovenia
Turkish expatriate sportspeople in Switzerland
Ziraat Bankası volleyball players